Maçka may refer to:

Places
 Maçka, a district of Trabzon Province in Turkey
 Maçka, İstanbul, a neighbourhood within the Nişantaşı quarter of the Şişli district in Istanbul, Turkey

Other uses
 Maçka Gondola, aerial lift line Tf1 connecting Maçka and Taşkışla in Istanbul, Turkey